This is the full discography of American band OK Go.

Studio albums

Live albums

EPs

Singles

Notes

References

Discographies of American artists
Rock music group discographies
Discography